Jason Halbert (born June 3, 1974) is an American producer, music director, musician, engineer and songwriter. He has been Kelly Clarkson's music director since 2003, shortly after her American Idol win. He has also served as music director for Nick Carter, Clay Aiken,  Justin Guarini in addition to touring as keyboardist for Paulina Rubio and Reba McEntire.

Halbert began his music career as keyboardist for DC Talk in 1994. He was also a founding member of the band SonicFlood.

As a record producer Halbert has won a Grammy for his contributions to Kelly Clarkson's Stronger album which won the Grammy for Best Pop Vocal album in 2013.

As a songwriter, Halbert has co-written several songs with Kelly Clarkson, including Catch My Breath and "Cry". "Cry" was also featured in the Glee Season Three episode "Choke", performed by Lea Michele.

In 2016 Halbert produced "Piece by Piece" (Idol Version) and also accompanied Clarkson, on piano for the recording. The song was nominated for a Grammy in the Best Pop Solo Performance category.

Along with Todd Mark Evans, Jason is also part of the Nashville-based duo the Brezhnev Society.

Halbert  has been noted as an early adopter of Ableton Live in his live performances with artists.

Discography

References

External links
 
 Brezhnev Society Website
 Kollektiv Sound Website

1974 births
Living people
American pop keyboardists
Record producers from Texas
American audio engineers
Songwriters from Texas
21st-century American engineers